The 1956 Syracuse Grand Prix was a motor race, set to Formula One rules, held on 15 April 1956 at the Syracuse Circuit, Sicily. The race was won by Argentinean Juan Manuel Fangio, in his Scuderia Ferrari entered Lancia D50.

Classification

Entry list

Qualifying

Race

References

Syracuse Grand Prix
Syracuse Grand Prix
Syracuse Grand Prix
Syracuse Grand Prix